The 2013–14 season is Citizen's 9th consecutive season in the Hong Kong First Division League. Citizen will compete in the First Division League, Senior Challenge Shield and FA Cup in this season.

Key events
 30 May 2013: Brazilian striker Detinho confirms that he will not retire and has extended a 1-year contract with the club.
 31 May 2013: Brazilian midfielder Gustavo Claudio da Silva leaves the club and joins fellow First Division club Yuen Long on a free transfer.
 31 May 2013: Brazilian striker Sandro leaves the club and joins Yuen Long on a free transfer.
 2 June 2013: Hong Kong defender Chan Siu Yuen joins the club from fellow First Division side Biu Chun Rangers on a free transfer.
 3 June 2013: Hong Kong international defender Chiu Chun Kit joins fellow First Division club Yuen Long on loan until the end of the season.
 3 June 2013: Brazilian striker Paulinho Piracicaba signs a 6-month contract extension with the club.
 3 June 2013: Hong Kong goalkeeper Liu Fu Yuen leaves the club and joins fellow First Division club Yuen Long on a free transfer.
 6 June 2013: Hong Kong midfielder Michael Campion leaves the club and joins fellow First Division club Sun Pegasus for an undisclosed fee.
 7 June 2013: Chinese-Hong Kong striker Yuan Yang leaves the club and joins fellow First Division club Sun Pegasus for an undisclosed fee.
 16 June 2013: Hong Kong midfielder Cheung Yu Sum leaves the club and joins newly promoted First Division club Yuen Long on a free transfer.
 28 June 2013: The Hong Kong Football Association assigns Tsing Yi Sports Ground as Citizen's home ground in the following season.
 14 July 2013: Ghana-born naturalised Hong Kong defender Moses Mensah leaves the club and joins fellow First Division club Biu Chun Rangers on a free transfer.
 15 July 2013: Serbian midfielder Marko Krasić joins the club from Indonesian Premier League club Arema FC for an undisclosed fee.
 18 July 2013: English-Hong Kong midfielder joins the club from fellow First Division club Kitchee on a free transfer.
 22 July 2013: Brazilian striker Stefan Pereira joins the club from Brazilian club Esporte Clube Jacuipense for an undisclosed fee.
 26 September 2013: Brazilian midfielder Fernando Augusto Avezedo Pereira joins the club from Brazilian club EC Jacuipense on an undisclosed fee.

Players

Squad information

Last update: 26 September 2013
Source: Citizen FC
Ordered by squad number.
LPLocal player; FPForeign player; NRNon-registered player

Transfers

In

Out

Loan In

Loan out

Squad statistics

Overall Stats
{|class="wikitable" style="text-align: center;"
|-
!width="100"|
!width="60"|First Division
!width="60"|Senior Shield
!width="60"|FA Cup
!width="60"|Total Stats
|-
|align=left|Games played    ||  0  ||  0  || 0  || 0
|-
|align=left|Games won       ||  0  ||  0  || 0  || 0
|-
|align=left|Games drawn     ||  0  ||  0  || 0  || 0
|-
|align=left|Games lost      ||  0  ||  0  || 0  || 0
|-
|align=left|Goals for       ||  0  ||  0  || 0  || 0
|-
|align=left|Goals against   ||  0  ||  0  || 0  || 0
|- =
|align=left|Players used    ||  0  ||  0  || 0  || 01
|-
|align=left|Yellow cards    ||  0  ||  0  || 0  || 0
|-
|align=left|Red cards       ||  0  ||  0  || 0  || 0
|-

Players Used: Citizen have used a total of 0 different players in all competitions.

Squad Stats

Top scorers

Disciplinary record

Substitution Record
Includes all competitive matches.

Last updated: 15 December 2013

Captains

Competitions

Overall

First Division League

Classification

Results summary

Results by round

Matches

Pre-season friendlies

First Division League

Senior Shield

Notes

References

Citizen AA seasons
Cit